Youssoufa Moukoko (born 20 November 2004) is a German professional footballer who plays as a striker for Bundesliga club Borussia Dortmund and the Germany national team. He is known for his scoring ability at younger age levels.

Club career

Early career
Moukoko played in the under-13 team of FC St. Pauli from 2014 to 2016 and scored 23 goals in 13 games as a striker in the U15.

In July 2016, he was transferred to Borussia Dortmund's youth academy. He played as the only 13-year-old in the Under 17 Bundesliga for Dortmund. Moukoko moved up to the under-19 team for the 2019–20 season at the age of 14, scoring six goals in his first match in the Under 19 Bundesliga in a 9–2 win against Wuppertaler SV. He completed his first UEFA Youth League match on 17 September 2019 against FC Barcelona, becoming the youngest player to be fielded in the competition. On 23 October 2019, Moukoko scored the opening goal in a game against Inter Milan, making him the youngest scorer in the Youth League. In total, Moukoko scored 141 goals in just 88 games for Dortmund's under-17 and under-19 sides.

Borussia Dortmund

2020–21 season
Since January 2020, Moukoko has also been allowed to train with BVB's senior team under Lucien Favre. As the previous DFB age restrictions were changed in 2020, he became eligible to play in the Bundesliga after his sixteenth birthday. On 21 November, a day after turning sixteen, he made his debut for Dortmund as an 85th-minute substitute for Erling Haaland against Hertha BSC. With the appearance, he became the youngest player in league history, breaking the previous record of 16 years and 334 days held by Nuri Şahin. The away match finished as a 5–2 win for Dortmund.

On 8 December, Moukoko made his debut for Dortmund in the UEFA Champions League as a substitute against Zenit Saint Petersburg, becoming the youngest player in the competition's history at the age of 16 years and 18 days. This broke the record previously held by Celestine Babayaro of 16 years and 87 days. He made his first start for Dortmund in the Bundesliga on 15 December against Werder Bremen, and scored his first goal three days later against Union Berlin. In doing so, he became the youngest goalscorer in Bundesliga history at the age of 16 years and 28 days, surpassing the record of 17 years and 34 days held by Florian Wirtz. Moukoko played 14 Bundesliga games in the 2020–21 season under Favre and his successor Edin Terzić in the forward position behind Erling Haaland (once in the starting eleven), in which he scored 3 goals. At the end of March 2021, he suffered an injury and was out until the end of the season.

2021–present
In the 2021–22 season, Moukoko was also under new head coach Marco Rose in the striker hierarchy behind Haaland, Donyell Malen and sometimes Steffen Tigges. After nine games for the first team, in which the attacker prepared a goal (the game-winning 3–2 against Hoffenheim), this also came at the end of November 2021 for the first time for the second team playing in the 3rd division. In total, Moukoko played 16 Bundesliga games, scoring 2 goals. He also won the DFB-Pokal with the club, his first title in professional football.

With the start of the 2022–23 season, Moukoko was used more frequently after the departure of Haaland and Tigges, as well as the illness of newly-signed Haaland replacement, Sébastien Haller. He scored his first goal of the season against SC Freiburg, in a 3–1 comeback victory for his side. On 17 September 2022, he scored the decisive goal for Dortmund against FC Schalke 04 in the Revierderby. Moukoko is a player that is widely touted to become one of the best strikers in the world. 

In January 2023, the striker extended his contract with the club until June 2026.

International career
Born in Yaoundé, Cameroon, Moukoko played for the Germany national U16 team for the first time on 11 September 2017, in a 3–1 victory over Austria. Two days later, in his second match against the same opponent, he scored both goals for Germany in a 2–1 victory. At that time he was the youngest player in the U16s. In order to protect Moukoko from too much media attention, BVB and the DFB decided not to continue using him in selected teams for the time being.

In March 2021, he received call up for the Germany U21 team, but received an injury in the training, ruling him out until the end of 2020–21 season. He later made his debut for the U21s on 2 September 2021, in a 6-0 win over San Marino, to which he contributed two goals. Moukoko thus became the youngest ever player and (double) scorer for the German U21 team.

In November 2022, he received call up for the Germany national team for the 2022 World Cup in Qatar. He made his debut in a pre-tournament friendly against Oman on 16 November, and became the youngest debutant for Germany since Uwe Seeler in 1954.

On 10 November 2022, he received a call-up for the 2022 FIFA World Cup in Qatar. On 23 November, he made his World Cup debut against Japan, in which he substituted Serge Gnabry in the 90th minute; hence, he became the youngest German player ever to feature in the World Cup, aged 18 years and 3 days.

Personal life
Moukoko has four siblings. His older brother, Borel, has been playing for Ferizaj since 2022.

Career statistics

Club

International

Honours
Borussia Dortmund
DFB-Pokal: 2020–21

Germany U21
UEFA European Under-21 Championship: 2021

Individual
Fritz Walter Medal U17 Gold: 2021

References

External links

Profile at the Borussia Dortmund website

2004 births
Living people
Footballers from Yaoundé
German footballers
Association football forwards
FC St. Pauli players
Borussia Dortmund players
Bundesliga players
Germany youth international footballers
Germany under-21 international footballers
Germany international footballers
2022 FIFA World Cup players
German people of Cameroonian descent
Cameroonian emigrants to Germany
Naturalized citizens of Germany
German sportspeople of African descent